The 1973 Texas A&M Aggies football team represented Texas A&M University in the 1973 NCAA Division I football season as a member of the Southwest Conference (SWC). The Aggies were led by head coach Emory Bellard in his second season and finished with a record of five wins and six losses (5–6 overall, 3–4 in the SWC).

Schedule

Roster

References

Texas AandM
Texas A&M Aggies football seasons
Texas AandM Aggies football